Cardeal Arcoverde / Copacabana Station is a subway station on the Rio de Janeiro Metro servicing the Copacabana area. It opened in July 1998.

References

Metrô Rio stations
Railway stations opened in 1998
1998 establishments in Brazil